Slave of the Huns is a novel by the Hungarian writer Géza Gárdonyi, published in 1901.  The original Hungarian title is A láthatatlan ember, which translates literally as The Invisible Man, but its title was changed in English (probably to differentiate it from H. G. Wells' novel).

In the opinion of some people, including Gárdonyi himself, it is his best work.  In 2005 it was ranked no. 38 in the Hungarian version of the survey "Big Read". An English translation by Andrew Feldmár was first published in 1969.

Plot summary
It is set around the time of Attila the Hun, and part of it is based on the Byzantine diplomat Priscus' account of his visit to Attila's court.

The narrator and hero of the novel is a young Byzantine nicknamed Zeta.  At the start he is sold into slavery as a child, and bought by Maximinus, in whose household he is treated sadistically.  He then becomes a slave of Priscus, who treats him much better, and eventually frees him.  He accompanies Priscus on his visit to Attila, and falls in love with Emmo, the daughter of a Hunnish nobleman (a "princesse lointaine" figure).  He commits himself to slavery among the Huns in the hope of eventually marrying her, to some extent going native among them.

It includes dramatic accounts of the Battle of the Catalaunian Plains between the Huns and the Romans, and the funeral of Attila.

It may have been influenced by earlier works such as Walter Scott's novel Waverley, Shakespeare's play Henry V and Tolstoy's novel The Cossacks.

See also 
Attila the Hun in popular culture

Notes 
 Amazon review
 online review
 Online text of the original Hungarian

Hungarian historical novels
War novels set in the Roman Empire
Novels set in the Byzantine Empire
Novels set in Hungary
Novels about slavery
1901 novels
Cultural depictions of Attila the Hun
Novels set in the 5th century
Child abuse in fiction